Henry Clayton may refer to:

 Henry DeLamar Clayton (general) (1827–1889), Confederate officer and Alabama legislator
 Henry De Lamar Clayton Jr. (1857–1929), US Congressman from Alabama
 Henry Helm Clayton (1861–1946), American meteorologist

See also
 Clayton Henry, comic book artist
 Harry Clayton (disambiguation)
 Clayton (disambiguation)